The pelvic inlet or superior aperture of the pelvis is a planar surface which defines the boundary between the pelvic cavity and the abdominal cavity (or, according to some authors, between two parts of the pelvic cavity, called lesser pelvis and greater pelvis). It is a major target of measurements of pelvimetry.

Its position and orientation relative to the skeleton of the pelvis is anatomically defined by its edge, the pelvic brim. The pelvic brim is an approximately apple-shaped line passing through the prominence of the sacrum, the arcuate and pectineal lines, and the upper margin of the pubic symphysis.

Occasionally, the terms pelvic inlet and pelvic brim are used interchangeably.

Boundaries
The edge of the pelvic inlet (pelvic brim) is formed as follows:

Diameters 
The diameters or conjugates of the pelvis are measured at the pelvic inlet and outlet and as oblique diameters.

Two diameters may be measured from the outside of the body using a pelvimeter

Additional images

See also
 Pelvic outlet

External links
 

Pelvis